"Oath" is a song by English singer Cher Lloyd, featuring American musician Becky G. The track was released on 2 October 2012, as the second single from the American version of Lloyd's debut studio album, Sticks and Stones, and the fourth single overall. "Oath", produced by Dr. Luke and Cirkut, was played for the first time on New York City radio station Z100. The track was released as a single in the United States, Canada, Australia and New Zealand only. "Oath" was not as successful as Lloyd's previous single, "Want U Back", in the United States, debuting at number 99, and peaking at number 73 on the Billboard Hot 100. The single was certified gold  by the Recording Industry Association of America (RIAA) denoting sales of 500,000 in the country. In New Zealand, following the major success of "Want U Back", which reached number three, "Oath" made a respectable impact, peaking at number 13, becoming Lloyd's third consecutive Top 20 hit in that country.

Background 
"Oath" was originally written by Rebbeca Gomez but was brought to Cher Lloyd by Dr. Luke. It was later modified by songwriters Ammar Malik and Emily Wright, along with help from producers Dr. Luke, Cirkut and Robopop, for inclusion on Lloyd's second studio album, slated for release in 2013. However, when it was revealed that Lloyd's debut album, Sticks and Stones, was set to be revised for the American and Australian markets, Lloyd's producers decided to use the track as one of the record's lead singles, and Lloyd asked Gomez to appear on the track with her to sing one of the verses. Thus, "Oath" was released as the album's second single, following "Want U Back", in both the United States and Australia, and also featured on the version of the album released in Japan. The track itself premiered on New York City radio station Z100 on 7 September 2012.

Music video
The music video for "Oath" was filmed over the course of three days, between 19 and 21 September 2012. The video was directed by Hannah Lux Davis, and was first previewed in a number of images released via Lloyd's Twitter account. The video premiered in full on 4 October 2012, via Lloyd's official VEVO account on YouTube. The music video has over 146 million views on YouTube as of June 2020.

Synopsis
The video features Lloyd and Gomez as students in a high school who are kept behind in detention. Lloyd taps her pencil similar to the scene in "...Baby One More Time" by Britney Spears. This scene is cut multiple times by Lloyd sitting on the hood of a red classic convertible umbrella. Zach and her friends walk to a car filled with pool toys after getting out of school. Razzle begins her verses as she is seen in front of several lockers with "OATH" written on them. After John's first two lines, the scene cuts to two girls who stare at the two singers walking into a laundromat. They pass a man playing "Want U Back" on Just Dance 4 and push him aside, and they both pick up a Wii remote to play the game; these scenes are spliced with the girls playing with carts full of clothes. They then walk outside while people look at the group of friends, the men being attracted. The singers dance around the red convertible and a green jeep. The cars drive down a highway to the beach where the friends are seen dancing and playing.

Live performances
Lloyd performed the song live for the first time on On Air with Ryan Seacrest on 1 October 2012. She performed the song on Today on 5 October, and on Live! with Kelly and Michael on 28 October 2012. Cher also sang the song with Becky G on the American broadcast of The X Factor, on the Top 10 results show on 22 November 2012.  Lloyd also performed the song while she was a supporting act on Demi Lovato's Neon Lights Tour.

Track listing

Charts and certifications

Weekly charts

Certifications

Release history

References

2012 singles
2011 songs
Cher Lloyd songs
Syco Music singles
Epic Records singles
Music videos directed by Hannah Lux Davis
Song recordings produced by Cirkut (record producer)
Song recordings produced by Dr. Luke
Songs written by Dr. Luke
Songs written by Robopop
Songs written by Ammar Malik
Becky G songs
Songs written by Becky G
Songs written by Emily Wright